Sophia Chiaureli (21 May 1937 – 2 March 2008), professionally known as Sofiko Chiaureli, was a Soviet Georgian actress. Thought to be the muse of filmmaker Sergei Parajanov, she played a significant role in the 20th century Georgian theater and was associated with the country's two most prominent theaters, the Rustaveli Theatre (1964–1968) and Marjanishvili Theatre (1960–1964, 1968–2008).

Biography 
Sofiko Chiaureli was born in Tbilisi.  Her parents were the film director Mikheil Chiaureli and the actress Veriko Anjaparidze. She graduated from the All-Russian Institute of Cinematography in Moscow and moved back to Tbilisi. In 1975 she was a member of the jury at the 9th Moscow International Film Festival.

Personal life 
Family:
 Daughter of Mikheil Chiaureli (Georgian film director) and Veriko Anjaparidze (Georgian actress).
 Cousin of Georgi Daneliya (Georgian and Russian film director)
 Former sister-in-law of Eldar Shengelaya.
 Mother of Nikoloz Shengelaya.

Married to:
 Giorgi Shengelaya (divorced) 2 children;
 Kote Makharadze (until 19 December 2002) (his death).

Filmography 
 Khevsurian Ballad (Хевсурская баллада, 1966) as Mzeqala
 Sayat Nova (Цвет граната, 1968) as young poet / poet's love / poet's muse / mime / angel / crazy nun
 Don't Grieve (Не горюй!, 1969) as Sofiko
 Natvris khe (Древо желания, 1976) as Pupala
  Einige Interviews zu persönlichen Fragen  (რამდენიმე ინტერვიუ პირად საკითხებზე, 1979) as Sofiko Alibaba Aur 40 Chor (Приключения Али-Бабы и сорока разбойников, 1979) as Zamira, mother of Ali BabaA Piece of Sky (1980) as Turnanta Look for a Woman (Ищите женщину, 1983) as Alisa Postic Vacation of Petrov and Vasechkin, Usual and Incredible (Каникулы Петрова и Васечкина, обыкновенные и невероятные, 1984) as grandmother of Manana The Legend of Suram Fortress (Легенда о Сурамской крепости, 1985) as Old Vardo Million in the wedding basket (Миллион в брачной корзине, 1985) as Valeria Ashug-Karibi (Ашик-Кериб, 1988) as Mom Artists cuts („ხელოვანთა კადრებიდან“, 2005) film by Shota Kalandadze

Honors
 People's Artist of Georgia (1976);
 People's Artist of Armenia (1979);
 Best Actress Award at The All-Union Film Festival (1966, 1972, 1974);
 Best Actress Award at the Locarno International Film Festival (1965);
 USSR State Prize (1980).

References

External links

Sofiko Chiaureli on Georgian National Filmography
 Soviet Georgian actress Sofiko Chiaureli 
The Times: Sofiko Chiaureli, Georgian actress who was the daughter of a Stalin toady and muse to a film director much distrusted by the Soviet Union

1937 births
2008 deaths
Film actresses from Georgia (country)
People's Artists of Georgia
People's Artists of Armenia
Soviet film actresses
Deaths from cancer in Georgia (country)
20th-century actresses from Georgia (country)
21st-century actresses from Georgia (country)
Actors from Tbilisi
Gerasimov Institute of Cinematography alumni
Stage actresses from Georgia (country)
Soviet stage actresses